Mark Chesnutt is the tenth studio album by the American country music artist of the same name. His only album for the Columbia Records Nashville label, it features the singles "She Was", "I Want My Baby Back" and "I'm in Love with a Married Woman", which peaked at #11, #47, and #48, respectively, on the Billboard Hot Country Songs charts. "I'm in Love with a Married Woman" was later recorded by Blaine Larsen on his 2006 album Rockin' You Tonight.

Track listing

Personnel

Eddie Bayers - drums
Michael Black - background vocals
Mike Brignardello - bass guitar
Mark Chesnutt - lead vocals
J.T. Corenflos - electric guitar
Eric Darken - percussion
Dan Dugmore - steel guitar
Larry Franklin - fiddle, mandolin
Paul Franklin - steel guitar
Aubrey Haynie - fiddle
Wes Hightower - background vocals
John Hobbs - keyboards, piano
John Barlow Jarvis - keyboards, piano
Paul Leim - drums
B. James Lowry - acoustic guitar
Liana Manis - background vocals
Brent Mason - electric guitar
Louis Dean Nunley - background vocals
Russ Pahl - banjo
Billy Panda - acoustic guitar
John Wesley Ryles - background vocals
Hank Singer - fiddle
Russell Terrell - background vocals
Neil Thrasher - background vocals
Robby Turner - steel guitar
Billy Joe Walker Jr. - electric guitar
Ray C. Walker - background vocals
Glenn Worf- bass guitar
Curtis Young - background vocals
Reggie Young - electric guitar
Andrea Zonn - fiddle, background vocals

Chart performance

References

2002 albums
Mark Chesnutt albums
Columbia Records albums
Albums produced by Billy Joe Walker Jr.